Events from the year 1983 in Kuwait.

Incumbents
Emir: Jaber Al-Ahmad Al-Jaber Al-Sabah
Prime Minister: Saad Al-Salim Al-Sabah

Events

Births

 17 August - Ali Al Shamali.
 1 December - Fahad Al Fahad.
 7 December - Fayez Bandar.

References

 
Kuwait
Kuwait
Years of the 20th century in Kuwait
1980s in Kuwait